Raoul, founder of Vaucelles Abbey or Saint Raoul (a/k/a San Raul, St. Radolph or Dom Rodulphe) (+1152) is a saint of the Catholic Church who founded the famous monastery of Vaucelles in France. Raoul was an English Benedictine monk who became a follower of St. Bernard of Clairvaux (who founded the Cistercian order).

St. Bernard sent Raoul, a "fervent monk", in 1132 to found a monastery at Vaucelles, located in the northwest of France, near Cambrai. By 1145, Raoul had succeeded in building the Abbaye de Vaucelles, which over the years grew to hold several hundred monks and became the largest Cistercian abbey of Europe. The restored cloister remains today. Raoul served as abbot for twenty years until his death in 1152.  With his monks he dedicated himself to prayer, reading of the sacred books and to teaching agriculture.

As part of his devotions, Saint Raoul said the following prayers daily: (1) Miserere: Have mercy on me, Lord, I am a sinner, (2) the Alleluia and (3) the Te Deum or Thanks be to God. Blessed be God.

Canonized for his rectitude and austerity in 1179, St. Raoul can be celebrated liturgically on 30 December.

References

Medieval French saints
French Benedictines
12th-century Christian saints
Medieval English saints